Ornstein–Uhlenbeck may refer to:

 Ornstein–Uhlenbeck operator
 Ornstein–Uhlenbeck process